Gabriel Brizard (ca. 1744 – 23 January 1793) often known as Abbé Brizard, and sometimes by the pen-name Gallophile (lover of France), was a writer and historian whose work was popular and respected in the 18th century. He was a lawyer at the Parliament of Paris. (Parlement de Paris)

He supported many of the reforms of the French revolution and admired Voltaire and his anti-clerical views. Brizard was also an admirer of Rousseau and Mably. His Éloge historique de l'abbé de Mably (eulogy/obituary) published after Mably's death won him a prize from the Académie des inscriptions et belles lettres in 1787.

References 
 French National Library catalogue
 Antoine De Baecque, Glory and Terror: Seven Deaths Under the French Revolution (2001)

Year of birth uncertain
1740s births
1793 deaths
French male writers